Desmophyllum is a genus of cnidarians belonging to the family Caryophylliidae.

The genus has cosmopolitan distribution.

Species
Species:
Desmophyllum affine 
Desmophyllum antiquatum 
Desmophyllum cantamessi 
Desmophyllum castellolense 
Desmophyllum clavatum 
Desmophyllum compressum 
Desmophyllum conulatum 
Desmophyllum coulsoni 
Desmophyllum crassum 
Desmophyllum cylindraceum 
Desmophyllum decuplum 
Desmophyllum defrancei 
Desmophyllum dianthus 
Desmophyllum edwardsianum 
Desmophyllum ehrenbergianum 
Desmophyllum elegans 
Desmophyllum exclavatum 
Desmophyllum fungiaeforme 
Desmophyllum gracile 
Desmophyllum hourigani 
Desmophyllum joannense 
Desmophyllum laevicostatum 
Desmophyllum lirioides 
Desmophyllum maximum 
Desmophyllum miocenicum 
Desmophyllum multicostatum 
Desmophyllum orbiculare 
Desmophyllum pedunculatum 
Desmophyllum pertusum 
Desmophyllum quinarium 
Desmophyllum semicostatum 
Desmophyllum stokesii 
Desmophyllum striatum 
Desmophyllum striatum 
Desmophyllum sulcatum 
Desmophyllum taurinense 
Desmophyllum willcoxi 
Desmophyllum zancleum

References

Caryophylliidae
Scleractinia genera
Taxa named by Christian Gottfried Ehrenberg